Ram Sundar Das Nishad is a leader of the Samajwadi Party in Uttar Pradesh.
On 10 June 2016, he was re-elected to the Uttar Pradesh Legislative Council.

References

Year of birth missing (living people)
Living people
Samajwadi Party politicians
Members of the Uttar Pradesh Legislative Council